Blimey! Games was an entertainment software development company in central London.  The CEO was Ian Bell, formerly Managing Director and founder of SimBin Development Team.

Blimey! Games comprised a specialist development team of 60 based in locations around the world.

History 
The company was founded in May 2005 by the development team who produced the PC Driving Game GTR - FIA GT Racing Game in 2004.

Blimey! Games also formed the core development team of GTR - FIA GT Racing Game 2, and sports car racing game, GT Legends.

In 2006, Blimey! Games, along with their publishers 10tacle Studios AG, signed a licence agreement for the development of video games with automotive manufacturer Ferrari.

Following the insolvency of 10tacle in 2008, on 8 January 2009, Blimey! went into administration with the staff being hired by and the business and assets being sold to Slightly Mad Studios Limited, a company that had also been established by Bell.

Games

References

British companies established in 2005
British companies disestablished in 2009
Defunct companies based in London
Video game companies established in 2005
Video game companies disestablished in 2009
Defunct video game companies of the United Kingdom
2005 establishments in England
2009 disestablishments in England